Akwasi Oppong Fosu (born February 1, 1958) is a Ghanaian politician. He has been the Member of Parliament for the Amenfi East constituency since 7 January 2013. He is a member of the National Democratic Congress.

He was appointed Minister for Local Government and Rural Development by President John Dramani Mahama in March 2013, and succeeded by Julius Debrah in that title in May 2014.

Personal life 
Fosu is a Christian (Word Miracle Church International). He is married with four children.

Early life and education 
Fosu was born on February 1, 1958. He hails from Afransiei, a town in the Western Region of Ghana. He entered the University of London and obtained his master's degree in Public Policy and Management in 2002.

Politics 
Fosu is a member of the National Democratic Congress (NDC). In 2012, he contested for the Amenfi East seat on the ticket of the NDC sixth parliament of the fourth republic and won.

Employment 
Fosu is employed in local government service in Accra.

See also
List of Mahama government ministers
Amenfi East

References

External links
Parliament of Ghana
Ghana government

Living people
Local government ministers of Ghana
Ghanaian MPs 2013–2017
National Democratic Congress (Ghana) politicians
1958 births